Soye may refer to:

People
 Jimmy Soye (born 1885), Scottish football player
 Jean-Louis Soye (1774-1832), French general (fr, no, ru)

Places
 
 
 Soye, Doubs, France
 Soye, Mali
 Soye-en-Septaine, Cher, France